The following is a list of FCC-licensed radio stations in the U.S. state of New Hampshire, which can be sorted by their call signs, frequencies, cities of license, licensees, and programming formats.

List of radio stations

Defunct
 WCNH (Bow, New Hampshire)

References

 
New Hampshire
Radio